Knobmount is an unincorporated community in Mineral County, West Virginia, United States.

References 

Unincorporated communities in West Virginia
Unincorporated communities in Mineral County, West Virginia